Prayers for Bobby: A Mother's Coming to Terms with the Suicide of Her Gay Son is a book by Leroy F. Aarons that outlines a mother's experience in coming to terms with the suicide of her gay son. On January 24, 2009, the TV film Prayers for Bobby, an adaptation of the book starring Sigourney Weaver and Ryan Kelley in the title role as Bobby, was shown on the Lifetime cable network.

Book summary
This book illustrates the story of Mary Griffith and her ordeal with her gay son, Robert Warren, known as Bobby. Her Christian intolerance and hard-nosed indoctrination leads him to despise who he is and ultimately he dies by suicide in 1983. Mary begins to question her faith because Bobby had killed himself and wonders what will happen to his soul. After some soul-searching of her own, she comes to the harsh realization that nothing was wrong with Bobby in God's eyes. She later becomes an advocate for gay rights in memory of her son. This story contains excerpts of Bobby's diary throughout the book to illustrate his feelings and point of view.

Development
In 1989, Leroy Aarons read a newspaper story about a young man's suicide. Particularly striking to him was the mother, Mary Griffith, who had tried throughout her son's adolescence to "pray away" his "gay nature". At age 20, Bobby Griffith jumped to his death from a freeway bridge in Portland, Oregon. Mary was transformed by her loss and eventually renounced the rigid religious beliefs that had kept her from fully accepting Bobby during his lifetime.

The Griffiths' story resonated with Aarons' own transformation as an openly gay journalist and activist. After Bobby's death, his mother became an iconic activist for the national association PFLAG, urging parents to understand and accept their children's homosexuality. "This extraordinary conversion touched me as deeply as the tale of Bobby's tragic death," Aarons wrote. "What enabled her to transcend her background and perform what could only be described as acts of courage."

After leaving daily journalism in 1991, Aarons began to explore the Griffiths' stories in depth. Prayers for Bobby: A Mother's Coming to Terms with the Suicide of Her Gay Son — Aarons' first book — was published by HarperCollins in 1995.

See also
List of LGBT-related suicides
Suicide among LGBT youth

References

American biographies
HarperCollins books
1995 non-fiction books
Books about depression
Books about suicide
Gay non-fiction books
Biographies about LGBT people
1990s LGBT literature
LGBT literature in the United States